The Syntasty (Syntasty; , Sintashta), in its lower course Zhelkuar, is a river of Kazakhstan (Kostanay Region) and Russia (Chelyabinsk Oblast). It is a left tributary of the Tobol.

References

Rivers of Kazakhstan
Rivers of Chelyabinsk Oblast